The Design of Everyday Things is a best-selling book by cognitive scientist and usability engineer Donald Norman about how design serves as the communication between object and user, and how to optimize that conduit of communication in order to make the experience of using the object pleasurable. One of the main premises of the book is that although people are often keen to blame themselves when objects appear to malfunction, it is not the fault of the user but rather the lack of intuitive guidance that should be present in the design.

The book was originally published in 1988 with the title The Psychology of Everyday Things. Norman said his academic peers liked that title, but believed the new title better conveyed the content of the book and better attracted interested readers. It is often referred to by the initialisms POET and DOET.

Norman uses case studies to describe the psychology behind what he deems good and bad design, and proposes design principles. The book spans several disciplines including behavioral psychology, ergonomics, and design practice.

A major update of the book, The Design of Everyday Things: Revised and Expanded Edition, was published in 2013.

Contents

In the book, Norman introduced the term affordance as it applied to design, borrowing James J. Gibson's concept from ecological psychology. Examples of affordances are flat plates on doors meant to be pushed, small finger-size push-buttons, and long and rounded bars we intuitively use as handles. As Norman used the term, the plate or button affords pushing, while the bar or handle affords pulling. Norman discussed door handles at length.

He also popularized the term user-centered design, which he had previously referred to in User-Centered System Design in 1986. He used the term to describe design based on the needs of the user, leaving aside what he deemed secondary issues like aesthetics. User-centered design involves simplifying the structure of tasks, making things visible, getting the mapping right, exploiting the powers of constraint, designing for error, explaining affordances, and seven stages of action. He went to great lengths to define and explain these terms in detail, giving examples following and going against the advice given and pointing out the consequences.

Other topics of the book include:

 The Psychopathology of Everyday Things
 The Psychology of Everyday Actions
 Knowledge in the Head and in the World
 Knowing What to Do
 To Err Is Human
 Human-Centered Design
 The Design Challenge

After a group of industrial designers felt affronted after reading an early draft, Norman rewrote the book to make it more sympathetic to the profession.

See also
Emotional Design
Seven stages of action
User-centered design
Industrial design
Interaction design
Principles of user interface design

References

Further reading

Books about cognition
Industrial design
Business books
1988 non-fiction books